Korićanske stijene  (Korićani's Rocks) are nearly vertical cliffs  above  Ilomska Canyon (on Vlašić Mountain). It is located about half a kilometer from the village Korićani, at an altitude between of about 750 and 1,100 meters. On the right cliff above Ilomska are Marići's and Imljani's rocks (1,100 m also). Thus, the depth of the abyss is 350 to 400 meters.

History 
On  August 21, 1992, the rocks were the site of the Korićani Cliffs massacre of more than 200 civilians (Bosniaks and Croats) from Prijedor.

Every year on August 21 at Korićanske rocks, the anniversary of the massacre is marked by throwing 250 roses into the abyss, symbolizing the murdered civilians.

References

See also 
Vlašić
Pougarje
Ilomska
Imljani
Skender Vakuf

Landforms of Bosnia and Herzegovina
Cliffs of Europe